The Zimovia Highway is a  highway located in Wrangell, Alaska.

Major intersections

References

Transportation in Wrangell, Alaska
State highways in Alaska